Stelis janetiae is a species of orchid plant native to Costa Rica.

References 

janetiae
Flora of Costa Rica